The Mars hoax was a hoax circulated by e-mail that began in 2003, that claimed that Mars would look as large as the full Moon to the naked eye on August 27, 2003. The hoax has since resurfaced each time before Mars is at its closest to Earth, about every 22 months. It began from a misinterpretation and exaggeration of a sentence in an e-mail message that reported the close approach between Mars and the Earth in August 2003.

Background 
Both Earth and Mars are in elliptical orbits around the Sun in approximately the same plane. By the nature of the laws of physics, the distance between them varies periodically from a minimum equal to the distance between their orbits at some point along them, to a maximum when they are on opposite sides of the Sun. These minimum (opposition) and maximum distances vary considerably as the two planets progress along their elliptical orbits, and occur about every 780 days. Mars was closer to the Earth in August 2003 (at the opposition) than it had been since 57,617 BC, and than it will be until 2287.

There was another opposition on 30 October 2005, but with a minimum distance about 25% greater than in 2003 (as reported in the original email, text below) and apparent diameter correspondingly smaller. The magnitude was −2.3, about 60% as bright as 2003. (The Moon has an apparent diameter of around 30 minutes of arc, i.e., 1800 arcseconds, with magnitude of about −12.7 when full, about 9,000 times brighter than Mars in the 2003 approach.)

Origin
The Mars hoax originated from an e-mail message in 2003, sometimes titled "Mars Spectacular", with images of Mars and the full moon side by side:

Although the e-mail itself is correct except for the statement that "it may be as long as 60,000 years before it happens again" (in fact, Mars will definitely come closer in 2287), the hoax stemmed from a misinterpretation of the sentence "At a modest 75-power magnification Mars will look as large as the full moon to the naked eye". The message was often [laxly] quoted with a line break in the middle of this sentence, leading some readers to mistakenly believe that "Mars will look as large as the full moon to the naked eye" when, in reality, this sentence means that Mars enlarged 75 times will look as big as the moon unenlarged.

It is quite obviously scientifically incorrect that Mars, normally never more than a dot in the night sky, could suddenly become visibly large due to normal variations in orbit. If Mars did appear as large as the moon it would be so close that it would cause tidal and gravitational effects—Mars has about twice the diameter of the Moon, and hence would be about twice as far away for the same apparent size. It has nine times the mass of the Moon, and would have about the same tidal effect (nine times the larger mass divided by relative distance cubed).

Resurfacing 
The hoax has resurfaced a number of times since 2003, often showing an altered image of twin moons over the Nilov Monastery, and may continue to do so, always announcing an imminent close Earth–Mars approach. The content of the original email, although almost entirely correct for August 27, 2003, has falsely been redated to announce a new close Earth–Mars approach—the real close approach was in 2003 only—also misinterpreting the original e-mail by saying that Mars will look as large as the Moon. The later e-mails are incorrect, as Mars will not come as close to Earth as it did in 2003 until August 28, 2287.

See also
List of hoaxes

References

External links
The Mars Hoax Goes Viral (NASA article from 2006)
Beware the Mars Hoax (NASA article from 2005)
Snopes page on the Mars Spectacular
Sky and Telescope Magazine: Mars Hoax Returns 
BBC News: The perennial Mars hoax e-mail
2006 Mars Hoax Powerpoint Presentation
MSNBC Video on the Mars hoax
MSNBC Cosmic Log
Exposing PseudoAstronomy - Episode 118: The Big Mars Hoax/The Two Moons Hoax
Italian guys exposing the Mars hoax
Mars Hoax warning at mars.nasa.gov (2018?)

Mars
Hoaxes in science
Internet hoaxes
2003 hoaxes